Diego Gilberto Nogueras (died 1566) was a Roman Catholic prelate who served as Bishop of Alife (1561–1566).

Biography
On 8 August 1561, Diego Gilberto Nogueras was appointed Bishop of Alife by Pope Pius IV.
He served as Bishop of Alife until his death in 1566.

References

External links and additional sources
 (for Chronology of Bishops) 
 (for Chronology of Bishops) 

16th-century Italian Roman Catholic bishops
Bishops appointed by Pope Pius IV
1566 deaths